The Burlington & Mount Holly Railroad and Transportation Company, was incorporated in 1836. The railroad ran 7.2 track miles from Burlington, New Jersey to Mount Holly Township, New Jersey. July 4, 1863 Burlington & Mount Holly Railroad & Transportation Company renamed Burlington County Railroad Company.

In 1895, the Pennsylvania Railroad used the Burlington & Mount Holly tracks to experiment with 500 volt DC trolley wire; trolley pole electric operation, with two motor passenger cars built by Jackson and Sharp Company at Wilmington, Del.

This service was discontinued on October 29, 1901, after the electrical powerhouse in Mount Holly burned.

In April 1902, PRR orders demolition of Mount Holly power house and ends experiment of electric trolley operation between Burlington and Mount Holly.

This line was the first electrified PRR branch in New Jersey. The Burlington & Mount Holly line was abandoned by the PRR in 1927.

County Route 541 in Burlington County is on and or follows the Burlington & Mount Holly Railroad and Transportation Company's right of way.

References 

Companies affiliated with the Pennsylvania Railroad
Defunct New Jersey railroads
Pennsylvania Railroad lines
Mount Holly, New Jersey
Burlington, New Jersey
1836 establishments in New Jersey

Closed railway lines in the United States